Cree Cicchino (born May 9, 2002) is an American actress. She began her career as a child actress playing one of the lead characters, Babe, in the Nickelodeon comedy television series Game Shakers, which aired from 2015 to 2019. She then went on to portray Marisol Fuentes in the Netflix comedy television series Mr. Iglesias, and Mim in the 2020 Netflix film The Sleepover.

Life and career 
Cicchino grew up in Glendale, Queens, New York. She is half Ecuadorian, half Italian, and has a twin sister. Cicchino started dancing at age 4, but her mother put her in acting classes at 11 or 12 years old after which she decided she wanted to be an actress.

In 2015, at age 13, Cicchino was cast in leading role of Babe in the Nickelodeon television comedy series Game Shakers, which ran for three seasons. In August 2018, she was cast in the role of Marisol Fuentes on the Netflix comedy series Mr. Iglesias, which debuted in 2019. In August 2019, Cicchino was cast as Mim, best friend to Clancy whose parents are kidnapped, in the Netflix film The Sleepover, which was released in August 2020. In July 2021, Cicchino was cast as Luisa Torres in the HBO Max limited television series And Just Like That..., based on Sex and the City. She is set to star in the upcoming film, Turtles All the Way Down.

Filmography

Accolades

References

External links 
 
 

2002 births
21st-century American actresses
Actresses from New York City
American child actresses
American television actresses
Living people